Charles Henri-Camille Lemaresquier (October 16, 1870, Sète - January 6, 1972, Paris) was a French architect and teacher.

Lemaresquier was born in Sète, in southern France, into a family of artists, and apprenticed to a Parisian architect at the age of 16.  He was accepted into the École nationale supérieure des beaux-arts de Paris in 1888, and by 1890 was in the atelier of Victor Laloux, who had taken over from his mentor Louis-Jules André after André's death.  

In the summer and fall of 1927, Lemaresquier represented France on the jury of nine European architects judging the high-profile Palace of Nations competition, assessing the 375 entries alongside fellow judges such as Hendrik Petrus Berlage, Victor Horta, and Josef Hoffman. 

Among his students were Max Ingrand and David Moreira da Silva.  The architect held seat #6 of the Architecture section of the Académie des Beaux-Arts from 1938 until his death in 1972. 

In 1900 Lemaresquier married Germaine Ribaucourt (1874-1951), and their union produced four children. His son Noël Le Maresquier (1903–1982) trained in his father's atelier, modified the family surname, and became an architect with a similar career with similar honors. Lemaresquier was also the father-in-law of French Prime Minister Michel Debré, who married the architect's daughter Anne-Marie.

Work 

Lemaresquier's work includes:

 headquarters for grocery retailer Félix Potin,  rue Réaumur, 1910
 apartment building, 2 rue Coustou, Paris, 1926
 National Circle of Armies, 8 Place Saint Augustin, on the former site of the Pépinière Barracks, Paris, with architectural sculpture by François-Léon Sicard, Paul Landowski, Jean Antoine Injalbert and Jean Boucher, 1927
 Juncasse veterinary school, 23 avenue Henri-Guillaumet, Toulouse, 1931
 Palais Berlitz, built as the Palais du Hanovre, 26-34 Rue Louis Legrand, Paris, 1932
 work at the Notre-Dame-de-l'Assomption, Paris, 1961

References

External links

1870 births
1972 deaths
19th-century French architects
20th-century French architects
People from Sète
Prix de Rome for architecture
Academic staff of the École des Beaux-Arts
École des Beaux-Arts alumni
Members of the Académie des beaux-arts
Chevaliers of the Légion d'honneur
French centenarians
Men centenarians